Marie Joseph Jean Raymond Silbert, known as José Silbert  (20 January 1862, Aix-en-Provence - 1 July 1936, Marseille) was a French Orientalist painter.

Biography 
His father, Sébastien Pierre Antoine Silbert (1820-1895), was a doctor. He received his first painting lessons locally from Jean Baptiste Martin (1818–1901). He then moved to Paris and enrolled at the Académie des Beaux-Arts, where he studied with Jules-Joseph Lefebvre and Luc-Olivier Merson Malerei studierte. 

He made his debut at the Paris in 1884, with a scene from the life of Saint Marinus. In 1885, he displayed a portrait of his father and, in 1887, a portrayal of Francis of Assisi with the Wolf of Gubbio. 

During this period, and later, he made numerous trips to North Africa. There, he often stayed in Algeria with the Orientalist painter, Étienne Dinet. Under his influence, Silbert created similar works, which are now among his best known. For several years, he was Director of the Association des Artistes Marseillais. 

In 1908, he was named a Knight in the Legion of Honor. He was also an Officer in the Tunisian Order of Glory and the Order of the Dragon of Annam.

His works may be seen at the Musée des beaux-arts de Marseille, Musée des beaux-arts de Chambéry and the Musée Cantini

Sources 
 André Alauzen di Genova: Dictionnaire des peintres et sculpteurs de Provence, Alpes, Côte d'Azur. Laffitte, Marseille 1986, .
 Roger Benjamin: Orientalist aesthetics, art, colonialism, and French North Africa, 1880–1930. University of California Press, Berkeley 2003, .
 Sophie Biass-Fabiani: Peintres de la couleur en Provence. Provence-Alpes-Côte-d'Azur, Office Régional de la Culture, Marseille 1995, .
 Élisabeth Cazenave: L' Afrique du Nord révélée par les musées de province. Giovanangeli, Paris 2004, .

External links 

More works by Silbert @ ArtNet
 Works by Silbert @ the Base Joconde

1862 births
1936 deaths
19th-century French painters
French portrait painters
French orientalists
Recipients of the Legion of Honour
artists from Aix-en-Provence
20th-century French painters